Jacques Bral (21 September 1948 – 17 January 2021) was a French film director, screenwriter, and producer. He was also a painter.

Biography
After his studies at Alborz High School in Tehran, Bral left Iran in 1966 for France. From 1966 to 1968, he studied architecture at Beaux-Arts de Paris and codirected the short film Quand tout le monde est parti with Julien Lévi and Jean-Paul Leca. He then directed feature films M-88 in 1970 and Frisou in 1973, both in black and white. In 1975, he directed Une baleine qui avait mal aux dents, which starred Francis Blanche and Bernadette Lafont.

In 1978, Bral founded the production company Les Films Noirs, which was responsible for the release of Extérieur, nuit in 1980. It was remastered for the Lumière Film Festival in Lyon in 2009, and a rerelease into theaters occurred on 27 June 2010.

In 1984, Bral directed the film Polar, which was an adaptation of the novel Morgue plein by Jean-Patrick Manchette. In 1989, he produced Street of No Return, the final feature film in the career of American director Samuel Fuller. His poetic fable Mauvais garçon was released in 1993.

After directing many films, Bral focused on screenwriting, and served as both director and screenwriter for the film Un printemps à Paris, which won the Grand Prize at the Police Paris New York Film Festival in 2007. In 2012, he directed and produced Black Really Suits You, a cross-cultural romantic tragedy.

Jacques Bral died in Paris on 17 January 2021 at the age of 72.

Filmography

Director
Une baleine qui avait mal aux dents (1974)
Extérieur, nuit (1980)
Polar (1984)
Mauvais Garçon (1993)
Un printemps à Paris (2006)
Black Really Suits You (2012)

Writer
Une baleine qui avait mal aux dents (1974)
Extérieur, nuit (1980)
Polar (1984)
Street of No Return (1989)
Mauvais Garçon (1993)
Un printemps à Paris (2006)
Black Really Suits You (2012)

Actor
Quelques hommes de bonne volonté (1983)
L'Embellie (1995)

References

1948 births
2021 deaths
Writers from Tehran
Alborz High School alumni
École des Beaux-Arts alumni
French film directors
French film producers
French male screenwriters
20th-century French painters
20th-century French screenwriters
20th-century French male writers
21st-century French screenwriters
21st-century French male writers
21st-century French painters